The Gustave B. Kleinschmidt House is a historic house at 621 East 16th Street in Little Rock, Arkansas.  It is a -story wood-frame structure, with a cross-gabled hip roof, original weatherboard siding, and stuccoed brick foundation.  The front is asymmetrical, with a projecting gable section on the right, and an open wraparound porch on the right, supported by round columns.  Built about 1907, it is an early local example of Colonial Revival architecture.  Gustave Kleinschmidt, for whom it was built, was a German immigrant and a prominent local real estate agent.

The house was listed on the National Register of Historic Places in 2016.

See also
National Register of Historic Places listings in Little Rock, Arkansas

References

Houses on the National Register of Historic Places in Arkansas
Houses in Little Rock, Arkansas
National Register of Historic Places in Little Rock, Arkansas